Goose Islands Provincial Park is a provincial park protecting the Goose Islands on Lake Winnipegosis in Manitoba, Canada.

Goose Islands Provincial Park was designated a provincial park by the Government of Manitoba on 16 June 2017. The park is considered to be a Class III protected area under the IUCN protected area management categories.

The park protects an area of the Boreal Plains Ecozone (CEC) Five islands off the east shore of Lake Winnipegosis provide nesting habitat for ring-billed gulls, American herring gulls, Caspian terns, common terns and double-crested cormorants.

See also
List of protected areas of Manitoba
List of provincial parks in Manitoba

References

External links
 iNaturalist.ca: Goose Islands Provincial Park

Provincial parks of Manitoba

Parks in Northern Manitoba
Protected areas of Manitoba